The 1942 Arizona Wildcats football team represented the University of Arizona in the Border Conference during the 1942 college football season.  In their fourth season under head coach Mike Casteel, the Wildcats compiled a 6–4 record (4–2 against Border opponents), finished in fourth place in the conference, and outscored their opponents, 189 to 139. The team captain was Murl M. McCain, Jr.  The team played its home games in Arizona Stadium in Tucson, Arizona.

Schedule

References

Arizona
Arizona Wildcats football seasons
Arizona Wildcats football